Sydney William Ward (5 August 1907 – 31 December 2010) was an Australian-born New Zealand cricketer. Ward was a right-handed batsman who bowled right-arm medium pace. 

From the death of Frank Shipston on 6 July 2005 until his death, Ward was considered the oldest living first-class cricketer and the second oldest ever, behind Jim Hutchinson. Following his death, Cyril Perkins became the oldest living first-class cricketer.

Ward was born in Sydney, Australia, and moved to New Zealand at some point prior to playing first-class cricket for Wellington in the late 1920s. His first-class debut for Wellington came in the 1929/30 Plunket Shield against Otago. From 1929/30 to 1937/38, he represented Wellington in 10 first-class matches, with his final first-class match coming against Canterbury. In his 20 first-class innings, he scored 282 runs at a batting average of 14.84, with a single half century high score of 61, which came against Auckland in the 1934/35 season. In 1937-38 he was the leading batsman in Wellington senior club cricket, with 642 runs at an average of 64.20 for Kilbirnie, who won the championship.

He played representative rugby for Wellington between 1931 and 1934, when a broken leg ended his football career.

Ward served in the Royal New Zealand Air Force in World War II, stationed at Nelson. He worked as a jeweller and watchmaker in Wellington until 1982, then retired to the Wairarapa farming village of Kaiwaiwai, between Featherston and Martinborough.

See also
 Oldest first-class cricketers

References

External links
 
 
 

1907 births
2010 deaths
Cricketers from Sydney
Australian emigrants to New Zealand
New Zealand cricketers
Wellington cricketers
Wellington rugby union players
Men centenarians
New Zealand rugby union players
New Zealand military personnel of World War II
New Zealand centenarians